Diadumene is a genus of sea anemones. It is the only genus in the monotypic family 
Diadumenidae.

Species
The World Register of Marine Species lists the following species:-

Diadumene cincta Stephenson, 1925
Diadumene crocata (Hutton, 1880)
Diadumene franciscana Hand, 1956
Diadumene kameruniensis Carlgren, 1927
Diadumene leucolena (Verrill, 1866)
Diadumene lighti Hand, 1956
Diadumene lineata (Verrill, 1869)
Diadumene neozelanica Carlgren, 1924
Diadumene paranaensis Beneti, Stampar, Maronna, Morandini & Da Silveira, 2015
Diadumene schilleriana (Stoliczka, 1869)

References

Diadumenidae
Hexacorallia genera
Taxa named by Thomas Alan Stephenson